Meredith Kathleen Hagner (born May 31, 1987) is an American actress. She began her career portraying Liberty Ciccone on the CBS soap opera As the World Turns (2008–2010), which earned her a Daytime Emmy Award nomination for Outstanding Younger Actress in a Drama Series in 2009. Following her departure from As the World Turns, she appeared as a series regular on the FX drama Lights Out (2011) and the TBS sitcom Men at Work (2012–2014).

Hagner gained further prominence for her role as Portia Davenport in the TBS / HBO Max dark comedy series Search Party (2016–2022), receiving critical praise for her performance. She also appeared as a series regular on the Facebook Watch comedy-drama Strangers (2017–2018) and the Quibi comedy Dummy (2020). Hagner's film roles include Hits (2014), Folk Hero & Funny Guy (2016), The Oath (2018), Brightburn (2019), and Palm Springs (2020).

Early life
Hagner was born in New York City and grew up in Houston, Texas, and Chapel Hill, North Carolina. She attended Chapel Hill High School, graduating in 2005. She attended the Boston Conservatory for a year, but moved to New York after being offered acting opportunities. While in New York, she was cast in television and radio advertisements for 3M, Acuvue, JCPenney, Levi's, Radio Shack, Subway, and Truth.

Career
Hagner made her screen debut in the CBS daytime soap opera As the World Turns in 2008, as Liberty Ciccone, the illegitimate daughter of Brad Snyder and Janet Ciccone. She was nominated for a Daytime Emmy Award for Outstanding Younger Actress in a Drama Series in 2009. Hagner ended her two-year run as the character in March 2010, for a career on primetime television and feature film.

Hagner starred in the FX short-lived 2011 drama series Lights Out. She later was cast as lead on The CW pilot Awakening, but it not was picked up to series. Hagner also appeared in a recurring role in the medical comedy Royal Pains on USA Network as Libby, a teenager with an extreme case of cyberchondria from 2009 to 2011, and guest-starred on In Plain Sight, CSI: Miami, and The Following. In 2012, Hagner began starring as Amy Jordan in the TBS comedy series Men at Work. The series was canceled after three seasons in 2014.

In 2016, Hagner returned to network television in TBS dark comedy Search Party. Hagner stars in all five seasons as the accidentally investigative sidekick, Portia Davenport. Her portrayal of the shallow hipster actress was named by Rolling Stone magazine as one of the "20 Best TV Characters In 2016".

Personal life 
Hagner began a relationship with actor Wyatt Russell after meeting on the set of the film Folk Hero & Funny Guy in 2015. They became engaged in December 2018 and married in 2019. In November 2020, the couple announced they were expecting their first child. Their son Buddy Prine Russell was born in March 2021.

Filmography

Film

Television

Music video

Awards and nominations

References

External links
 

1987 births
Actresses from Houston
American soap opera actresses
Boston Conservatory at Berklee alumni
Living people
People from Chapel Hill, North Carolina
Actresses from New York (state)
American film actresses
American television actresses
21st-century American actresses
Actresses from North Carolina
Chapel Hill High School (Chapel Hill, North Carolina) alumni